Đinh Thế Huynh (born 15 May 1953 in Nam Định Province) is a Vietnamese politician and journalist who served as the Permanent Member of the Party Central Committee's Secretariat of the Communist Party of Vietnam, one of the country's five key leaders along with the General Secretary, President, Prime Minister, and the Chairman of the National Assembly. Once rumored to become the next Party's General Secretary, he stepped down in 2018 due to illness.

Đinh Thế Huynh is a member of the 11th and 12th Politburo and the former Chairman of the Party's Central Theoretical Council. He also served as Head of the Party's Propaganda Department between 2011 and 2016. A former editor-in-chief of state newspaper Nhân Dân, Đinh Thế Huynh became a member of the Communist Party of Vietnam on 8 August 1974. He represented the city of Da Nang in Vietnam's 14th National Assembly.

Early life
Đinh Thế Huynh was born on 15 May 1953 in Xuân Trường District in Nam Định Province. He joined the Vietnam People's Army in 1971 and participated in the 1972 battle of Quảng Trị. He joined the Communist Party in 1974. After the war, he was sent by the new communist government to study at Lomonosov Moscow State University and graduated with a degree in journalism. 

In 1988, Đinh Thế Huynh assumed the position of Vice editor of Nhân Dân, the official newspaper of the Communist Party of Vietnam. In 2001, he was appointed Editor-in-Chief of the paper and became a member of the Central Committee of the Communist Party. In 2011, he became member of the Politburo and Head of the Propaganda Department.

References

Deputy Prime Ministers of Vietnam
1953 births
Living people
Members of the 11th Politburo of the Communist Party of Vietnam
Members of the 12th Politburo of the Communist Party of Vietnam
Members of the 11th Secretariat of the Communist Party of Vietnam
Members of the 12th Secretariat of the Communist Party of Vietnam
Members of the 9th Central Committee of the Communist Party of Vietnam
Members of the 10th Central Committee of the Communist Party of Vietnam
Members of the 11th Central Committee of the Communist Party of Vietnam
Members of the 12th Central Committee of the Communist Party of Vietnam
People from Nam Định province